Akseh-ye Sofla (also Romanized as ‘Akseh-ye Soflá; also known as Āchseh-ye Pā’īn) is a village in Abdoliyeh-ye Sharqi Rural District, in the Central District of Ramshir County, Khuzestan Province, Iran. At the 2006 census, its population was 31, in 4 families.

References 

Populated places in Ramshir County